The 1966 Valley State Matadors football team represented San Fernando Valley State College—now known as California State University, Northridge—as a member of the California Collegiate Athletic Association (CCAA) during the 1966 NCAA College Division football season. Led by fifth-year head coach Sam Winningham, Valley State compiled an overall record of 2–7–1 with a mark of 0–5 in conference play, placing last out of six teams in the CCAA. The team was outscored 260–152 for the season. The Matadors played home games at Birmingham High School in Van Nuys, California.

Schedule

References

Valley State
Cal State Northridge Matadors football seasons
Valley State Matadors football